Night Angels (Brazilian title: Anjos da Noite) is a 1987 Brazilian drama movie, directed by Wilson Barros.

Cast
 Zezé Motta as Malu
 Antônio Fagundes as Jorge Tadeu
 Marco Nanini as Guto
 Chiquinho Brandão as Lola / Mauro
 Aida Leiner as Milene
 Cláudio Mamberti as Fofo
 Aldo Bueno as Bimbo
 Ana Ramalho as Maria Clara
 José Rubens Chachá as Leger
 Letícia Imbassahy as Esmeralda
 Guilherme Leme as Teddy
 Be Valério as Cissa
 Marília Pêra as Marta Brum
 Sérgio Mamberti as Apresentador
 Arrigo Barnabé as Arrigo

Awards
The film won several awards at the 1987 Gramado Film Festival, including award for best supporting actor, best actress (co-won with another film), best director, best cinematography, best photography (José Roberto Eliezer) and best Production Design (Cristiano Amaral).

References

External links 
 

1987 films
1987 drama films
Brazilian drama films